Macau competed at the 2015 World Aquatics Championships in Kazan, Russia from 24 July to 9 August 2015.

Swimming

Macau swimmers have achieved qualifying standards in the following events (up to a maximum of 2 swimmers in each event at the A-standard entry time, and 1 at the B-standard):

Men

Women

Mixed

Synchronized swimming

Macau fielded a full squad of ten synchronized swimmers to compete in each of the following events.

References

External links
Kazan 2015 Official Site

Nations at the 2015 World Aquatics Championships
2015 in Macau sport
Macau at the World Aquatics Championships